Rap guanine nucleotide exchange factor 5 is a protein that in humans is encoded by the RAPGEF5 gene.

Members of the RAS subfamily (see HRAS; MIM 190020) of GTPases function in signal transduction as GTP/GDP-regulated switches that cycle between inactive GDP- and active GTP-bound states. Guanine nucleotide exchange factors (GEFs), such as RAPGEF5, serve as RAS activators by promoting acquisition of GTP to maintain the active GTP-bound state and are the key link between cell surface receptors and RAS activation (Rebhun et al., 2000).[supplied by OMIM]

References

Further reading